The 2022 season was the Los Angeles Chargers' 53rd in the National Football League (NFL), their 63rd overall, their seventh in the Greater Los Angeles Area, their third playing their home games at SoFi Stadium and their second under head coach Brandon Staley. 

The Chargers improved on their 9–8 record from the previous year after a Week 17 win over the Los Angeles Rams. After the Chargers beat the Indianapolis Colts in Week 16, the Chargers clinched a playoff berth for the first time since 2018. In the Wild Card round despite amassing a 27–0 lead during the second quarter, the Chargers collapsed in the second-half of the game, losing to the Jacksonville Jaguars 30–31 on a last-second field goal. It was the third largest blown lead in NFL postseason history, behind the 1992 Houston Oilers and 2013 Kansas City Chiefs, and it is the biggest blown lead in the history of the Chargers.

Roster changes

Free agency

Unrestricted

Restricted and exclusive-rights

Futures 
Shortly after the end of their 2021 season, the Chargers signed eleven players on their practice squad to reserve/future free agent contracts.

Signings

Releases/waivers

Contract extensions

Player trades

Practice squad elevations
Each NFL team is permitted to elevate up to two players from the practice squad to the active game day roster per week, with those designated players being allowed to return to the practice squad up to two times without being exposed to waivers. If a practice squad player is elevated to the game day roster for a third time, that player will be required to clear waivers before returning to the practice squad. Teams are also permitted to protect a maximum of four practice squad players to prevent opposing teams from signing those players to their active rosters.

Injuries
July 26: Linebacker Kenneth Murray was placed on the PUP list as he was recovering from an ankle surgery in April. Murray was activated from the PUP list on August 22.
August 23: The Chargers announced that cornerback J. C. Jackson would miss two to four weeks due to a procedure on his ankle. Jackson made his debut in week 2 against the Kansas City Chiefs.
September 11: Wide receiver Keenan Allen picked up a hamstring injury during the second quarter of the game against the Las Vegas Raiders and did not return to the game. Allen sat out for the week 2 match-up against the Kansas City Chiefs and returned to practice on September 21.
September 15: Center Corey Linsley suffered a knee injury and did not play the second half of the game in Kansas City. Right tackle Trey Pipkins injured his ankle and left the game in the second half. Quarterback Justin Herbert sustained a fracture to his rib cartilage during the fourth quarter of the game in Kansas City and was able to finish the game.
September 25: J. C. Jackson, Corey Linsley, and Keenan Allen were unable to play against the Jacksonville Jaguars. Defensive end Joey Bosa left the game against the Jacksonville Jaguars in the first quarter with a groin injury. Left tackle Rashawn Slater suffered a ruptured left bicep tendon in the third quarter of the game. Wide receiver Jalen Guyton tore his left ACL on the final drive of the game. On September 27, Guyton was placed on season-ending injured reserve.
September 28: Rashawn Slater was placed on injured reserve with a season-ending injury. Joey Bosa was placed on injured reserve and head coach Brandon Staley announced Bosa would require surgery on a core muscle injury and expected Bosa to return later in the season.
October 9: Kicker Dustin Hopkins did not play against the Cleveland Browns due to a quadriceps injury.
October 17: Center Corey Linsley did not play against the Denver Broncos due to food poisoning. Running back Joshua Kelley suffered a sprained MCL in the first quarter against the Denver Broncos. Kicker Dustin Hopkins injured his hamstring in the second quarter and was able to finish the game. Hopkins is expected to miss two-to-four weeks. Kelley was placed on injured reserve on October 22.
October 19: Tight end Donald Parham and wide receiver Josh Palmer were placed in consussion protocol and were ruled out for the game against the Seattle Seahawks.
October 23: Cornerback J. C. Jackson suffered a season-ending ruptured patellar tendon in the second quarter against the Seattle Seahawks. Wide receiver Keenan Allen played his first game since his Week 1 hamstring injury. Allen did not play in the second half of the game so as to not risk a re-injury. Edge rusher Chris Rumph was diagnosed with a sprained MCL. Wide receiver Mike Williams suffered a right high ankle sprain in the fourth quarter. Jackson was placed on injured reserve on October 26.
November 2: Wide receiver Keenan Allen did not practice and was held out of the week 9 game as he was still not fully recovered from his hamstring injury. Tight end Donald Parham and wide receiver Josh Palmer were cleared from concussion protocol and returned to practice.
November 3: Kicker Taylor Bertolet was placed on the practice squad injured list.
November 5: Tight end Donald Parham was placed on injured reserve with a hamstring injury.
November 6: Defensive end Jerry Tillery did not play against the Atlanta Falcons due to a back inury. Nose tackle Austin Johnson injured his left knee in the third quarter and left the game. Johnson was diagnosed with an MCL injury and fractured knee and ruled out for the season. Johnson was placed on injured reserve on November 9. Trey Pipkins aggravated his sprained MCL.

Draft

Draft trades

Staff

Coaching changes

Final roster

Team captains
Justin Herbert (QB)
Austin Ekeler (RB)
Khalil Mack (OLB)
Derwin James (SS)

Preseason
The Chargers' preseason opponents and schedule was announced on May 12, 2022. The Chargers held joint practices with the Dallas Cowboys on August 17 and 18 at the Jack Hammett Sports Complex in Costa Mesa, California.

Regular season

Schedule
On April 28, during the first round of the 2022 Draft, the NFL announced that the Chargers will play at the Kansas City Chiefs during Week 2 on September 15, in the first game of Amazon Prime Video's new Thursday Night Football package.

The Chargers' complete 2022 schedule was announced on May 12. Listed below are the Chargers' opponents for 2022:

Note: Intra-division opponents are in bold text.

Game summaries

Week 1: vs. Las Vegas Raiders

After both teams began the game with a field goal and a punt, Allen had back-to-back catches of 19 and 42 yards, moving the Chargers to the Las Vegas 11 yard line. Three plays later, Herbert gained only 3 yards on a 3rd and 4, but Nate Hobbs was penalised for unnecessary roughness, having hit Herbert as he entered a slide. That gave the Chargers a fresh set of downs, and Horvath's touchdown followed three plays later.
On the next Charger drive, Carter's 30-yard catch moved them into Raider territory. They reached a 3rd and 1 at the 28 before both Ekeler and Herbert were stopped for no gain, turning the ball over on downs. On the next two plays, Derek Carr was sacked by Mack and intercepted by Tranquill, who returned the ball 20 yards to the Raider 31. Two plays later, Herbert found Carter between two defenders in the front of the end zone for a 17–3 halftime lead.

A 41-yard catch by Davante Adams helped the Raiders score only five plays into the second half. The Chargers responded with a drive where Herbert completed 6 of 7 passes for 55 yards and a touchdown to Everett. Las Vegas converted a 4th and 4 on their next possession, reaching the Charger 25. The Raiders then tried a trick play, Bosa sacked Adams for a 10-yard and they eventually settled for Daniel Carlson's long field goal. The next two Raider drives ended with interceptions by Samuel (on a deep pass at his own 2), and Callahan (near midfield). The Chargers had a field goal try after the latter of these, but Hopkins was wide left from 49 yards out, and Las Vegas drove 61 yards for an Adams touchdown, trimming the deficit to five points. Nasir Adderley broke up the two-point conversion attempt in the end zone. Following a three-and-out by the Chargers, Las Vegas took over at their own 21 yard line with 3:30 to play. They reached a 3rd and 3 at their own 40 before Carr was sacked on consecutive plays, firstly by Bosa and Morgan Fox, then by Mack. Los Angeles took over on downs, and were able to run the clock out after Michel's 3-yard run on 3rd and 2.

All three Charger touchdowns were scored by players making their debut for the team. Two defensive debutants also contributed: Mack had three of the Chargers' six sacks while Callahan had one of their three interceptions. Los Angeles gained sixteen first downs on their first six drives, but only two from their final five.

Week 2: at Kansas City Chiefs

Kansas City were forced to punt on their first two drives, and the Chargers responded with a field goal and a touchdown. On the touchdown drive, Herbert converted a 4th and inches with a quarterback sneak, and Williams caught a 39-yard pass to the Chiefs' 1 yard line; Horvath scored two plays later. A 3rd-down Nasir Adderley interception on the ensuing drive was nullified by an illegal contact penalty on Callahan, leading to Mahomes' first touchdown pass. Los Angeles crossed midfield on their next two possessions, but had to punt both times and led 10–7 at halftime.

The Chargers opened the second half with a 75-yard touchdown drive. Ekeler converted on 3rd and 1 early in the drive, and later on 4th and 1; on the next play, Williams made a juggling one-handed catch in the end zone. Patrick Mahomes threw his next pass directly to Samuel, who initially mishandled the ball before diving forward and gathering it near the ground. Los Angeles were initially awarded the ball at the Kansas City 35, but the turnover was overturned on official review, with some controversy. Mahomes then led the Chiefs to another touchdown. Late in the 3rd quarter, Kansas City had a 3rd and goal at the Charger 1, but Joseph and Bosa stopped Travis Kelce for no gain, and the Chiefs settled for a game-tying field goal. Los Angeles then drove into Chiefs territory, where Everett had back-to-back catch-and-runs of 7 and 26 yards, moving the ball to the 3. Everett asked to be taken out of the game due to fatigue after the second catch, but was unable to leave as the Chargers were in a hurry-up offense. He failed to break on the ball on the next play; Herbert's pass was intercepted and returned 99 yards for a touchdown. Clyde Edwards-Helaire broke off a 52-yard run late in the game, allowing the Chiefs to pad their lead with a field goal. Herbert converted two 4th downs on the next drive, the latter to Palmer for a touchdown, but Kansas City recovered an onside kick and ran out the clock.

Herbert played on after sustaining fractured rib cartilage late in the game. Horvath became the first running back or fullback to score receiving touchdowns in the first two games of his career since 1942.

Week 3: vs. Jacksonville Jaguars

On the game's first drive, the Charger defense forced an incompletion when Jacksonville went for it on 4th and 5 from the Los Angeles 39. They also held the Jaguars to a pair of short field goals, the latter after a Herbert interception; he fumbled while being sacked soon afterwards, setting up the first Jacksonville touchdown. Herbert responded on his next drive by completing 7 of 8 passes for 75 yards and a touchdown to Williams. An Evan Engram touchdown catch was overturned after a lengthy official review, and Jacksonville settled for a field goal and 16–7 halftime lead.

Facing a 3rd and 15 three plays into the second half, Herbert connected with Guyton 54 yards downfield. A completion to Palmer brought up 1st and goal from the 7, from where three Herbert incompletions were followed by a field goal. On the next drive, Jacksonville running back James Robinson broke away for a 50-yard touchdown on 4th and 1. The Jaguars followed this with a pair of 14-play drives as they pulled away.

Los Angeles possessed the ball for only 21:33, and were outgained by 151–26 in rushing yards.

Week 4: at Houston Texans

Nasir Adderley's interception on the third play of the game set up Gerald Everett's 18-yard touchdown reception, which came on 3rd and 3. Houston kicker Kaʻimi Fairbairn missed a 46-yard field goal late in the opening quarter, and the Chargers scored again when Ekeler broke through the right guard area for his first touchdown of the season. He scored again within three minutes: the Texans went three-and-out, Williams was left completely open on a 50-yard catch-and-run, and Ekeler went in on the following play. Houston responded with Dameon Pierce's 75-yard touchdown run on the next play from scrimmage. Following a Dustin Hopkins field goal, the Texans reached a 4th and 1 at the Charger 24. They went for the first down, but Mack sacked Davis Mills for a loss of 8. Bandy had catches of 24 and 25 yards on the next drive, the first two of his career, and Hopkins made it 27–7 at halftime.

Houston came back into the game late in the 3rd quarter and early in the 4th with quick two touchdown drives; combined, they covered 180 yards from only 13 plays. Carter fumbled the ensuing kickoff, with the Texans recovering at the 16. Helped by Tillery's second-down sack, the Charger defense allowed only a field goal, keeping Los Angeles ahead at 27–24 with 8:30 to play. Herbert then led a 12-play drive to restore a margin of comfort. A completion to Williams converted a 3rd and 2, before Staley opted to go for it on 4th and 2 from the Charger 45. Herbert found Ekeler unmarked in the right flat for a 21-yard gain. Also Williams converted a 3rd and 6, and Ekeler's third touchdown came two plays later. Callahan's subsequent interception effectively clinched the win.

Los Angeles gave up 255 total yards on the three Houston touchdown drives but only 91 yards on their other nine drives. Ekeler gained 60 rushing yards and 49 receiving yards to go with his three total touchdowns.

Week 5: at Cleveland Browns

Cleveland took the lead five plays into the game when Nick Chubb broke numerous tackles on a 41-yard touchdown run. In response, Los Angeles reached a 4th and 2 from the Cleveland 28, but Herbert threw incomplete and the Browns drove 72 yards to double their lead. On the next play from scrimmage, Ekeler broke away on a 71-yard run, eventually being tackled from behind at the Cleveland 4. The Chargers were unable to take full advantage of the opportunity, and settled for a Taylor Bertolet field goal. After a Cleveland three-and-out, Williams' 38-yard catch moved the Chargers into opposition territory, eventually leading to Kelley's touchdown. The Browns again went three-and-out, this time pinning Los Angeles at their own 1-yard line with a Corey Bojorquez punt. The Chargers then produced their first 99-yard touchdown drive since the 2017 season, doing so without facing a 3rd down. Ekeler had back-to-back carries of 10 and 15 yards in the middle of the drive, and finished it by making a one-handed catch and completing a 12-yard touchdown. Cleveland retook the lead with Chubb's second touchdown run, one play after Joseph-Day was flagged for roughing the passer on a 3rd-down incompletion. The Browns had a chance to extend their lead before halftime, but Cade York's 45-yard attempt missed wide right, leaving the score at 21–17.

On the opening drive of the second half, Herbert and Williams connected for 21 yards to convert a 3rd and 12. Williams later had a 22-yard touchdown catch overruled due to having a foot out of bounds, but Ekeler scored on the next play. Soon afterwards, Cleveland went for it on 4th and 1 from their own 34, but Covington broke through the line and tackled Kareem Hunt for a loss of 4, setting up another field goal. Hunt scored on the following drive, putting Cleveland up 28–27 late in the 3rd quarter. Runs of 16 yards by Ekeler and 17 yards by Kelley then helped the Chargers drive inside Cleveland's 10, where they had to settle for their third short field goal of the game. Jacoby Brissett converted a pair of 3rd downs on the following drive, but his pass on 3rd and 7 from the 9 was intercepted by Gilman with 2:44 to play. A 19-yard Williams catch gave the Chargers a first down, before they reached a 4th down with between 1 yard to 2 yards required; 1:14 remained, and Cleveland had used all their timeouts. Staley opted to go for a game-clinching conversion, but Herbert's pass to Williams was broken up, and the Browns took over at the Los Angeles 45. Brissett managed a 10-yard completion, but could move the ball no closer, and York's 54-yard kick missed narrowly to the right with 11 seconds to play.

Staley's 4th-down decision generated controversy after the game. The Los Angeles Times described the call as 'odd', and the injured Allen tweeted 'WTF are we doing?', though he deleted the tweet after talking with Staley. Sports analytics engines largely favored Staley's choice. Ekeler's 173 rushing yards were a new career high. As a team, the Chargers ran for 238 yards after gaining a league-worst 258 yards from their first four games.

Week 6: vs. Denver Broncos

Palmer drew a 30-yard pass interference penalty on the game's first play, and Bandy converted a 4th and 2 with and 4-yard catch, but the Chargers were pushed back by a Calpp false start and had to punt. A 21-yard pass interference call no Jackson then converted a Denver 3rd and 14; the Broncos reached a 3rd and 1 at the Los Angeles 29 before Mack sacked Russell Wilson and Brandon McManus kicked his first field goal. Denver faced a 3rd and 1 from their own 24 late in the opening quarter; Wilson completed consecutive passes of 37 and 39 yards, the latter for a touchdown and a 10–0 lead. Los Angeles responded with their only touchdown drive of the game. It featured four 3rd-down conversions – three via short completions from Herbert and one when Ekeler drove through the middle of the line for the touchdown. After a Denver three-and-out, the Chargers had another lengthy scoring drive, prolonged by pass interference penalties of 36 and 11 yards, both on 3rd down. They reached the Denver 12 before being pushed back by a sack on Herbert, and taking a field goal with 53 seconds to play in the half. A 47-yard Wilson completion helped the Broncos move into range for another McManus field goal, and a 13–10 halftime lead.

Los Angeles tied the score on their first possession of the second half; on their second, they reached a 4th and 2 at the Denver 29, but Herbert's pass was incomplete on the opening play of the final quarter. After a Denver punt, Herbert's next pass was deflected and intercepted, setting the Broncos up at the Charger 30. A Tranquill sack on 3rd down forced Denver to settle for another field goal. Unnecessary roughness and pass interference penalties by Denver contributed 35 yards to the ensuing Chargers drive, which ended with Hopkins' third field goal with four minutes to play. Both teams had one further possession in overtime: Tranquill again sacked Wilson on 3rd down to force a punt, and Herbert's pass from his own 44 fell incomplete as time expired.

Denver won the overtime coin toss and received the ball. Both teams then went three-and-out twice. After the last of these, the Chargers recovered a muffed punt at the Denver 28; Ja'Sir Taylor pushed his blocker back into the returner, who stumbled and failed to gather the ball, allowing Deane Leonard to recover. After Ekeler twice lost a yard, Herbert and Williams connected for 9 yards. Hopkins then made the winning kick, 7:22 into the extra period.

Hopkins made all four of his field goals despite injuring his hamstring while making his 2nd-quarter extra point. The Chargers' two longest gains on offense were both pass interference penalties. They had a 38:49 to 28:33 advantage in time of possession, including 12:27 to 2:33 in the 2nd quarter. Los Angeles had four sacks, all coming on 3rd down plays.

Week 7: vs. Seattle Seahawks

Kenneth Murray intercepted a tipped Geno Smith pass four plays into the game, setting the Chargers up at the Seattle 41. After three plays gained 9 yards, Ekeler was stuffed for no gain on a 4th and 1. Seattle's next drive was prolonged when Callahan was flagged for pass interference on 3rd and 13 and finished with Smith's 20-yard touchdown pass on 3rd and 14. Herbert threw an interception and lost a fumble on the next two Charger drives, setting up 10 further Seattle points. Herbert completed 5 of 6 passes for 64 yards on the following drive, converting a 3rd down with a completion to Allen, who played for the first time since Week 1. Mack recovered a botched snap at the Seattle 33 two plays later, and Herbert converted two further 3rd downs with passes, the latter to Williams for the touchdown. Seattle responded late in the half with Smith's second touchdown pass and led 24–14 at the break.

Los Angeles punted on their first drive of the second half, Scott pinning Seattle at their 7. The Seahawks responded with a 10-minute drive that penetrated inside the Charger 10-yard line before a Fox sack forced them to take a short field goal. Early in the final quarter, Scott produced another good punt, this time pinning Seattle at their own 2. On the following play, Joseph and Troy Reeder stopped Kenneth Walker III in the end zone for a safety. After another Seahawks field goal, Los Angeles reached a 4th and 13 at the Seattle 38. Williams caught Herbert's pass, but gained only 12 yards and severely twisted his ankle while being tackled. Walker broke away for the clinching touchdown a play later. Los Angeles did score once more through Ekeler's 4th-down catch, but Seattle recovered an onside kick and ran out the clock.

Week 9: at Atlanta Falcons

Atlanta had a 44-yard run on the game's third play, eventually leading to Cordarrelle Patterson's touchdown on 3rd and goal from the 1. The Falcons added a lengthy field goal drive after Los Angeles went three-and-out. Following an exchange of punts, the Chargers faced a 3rd and 15 at their own 12, but Herbert found an open Palmer for 25 yards. Further 3rd downs were converted with passes to Palmer, Everett and Bandy, before Ekeler scored from the 2. After an Atlanta three-and out, Herbert converted 3rd downs with completions to Ekeler and Carter, then threw to Ekeler in the right flat for a 14–10 halftime lead.

Patterson appeared to have scored a 38-yard touchdown early in the 3rd quarter, but it was nullified by penalty. Atlanta progress to a 2nd and 2 at the Charger 11, from where Marcus Mariota threw a 5-yard pass to Drake London. The receiver was fighting for extra yardage when Mack pulled the ball from his grasp and returned it 44 yards to midfield. Three plays later, Palmer was unable to hold a Herbert pass, which deflected off his hands and was intercepted. Atlanta converted the turnover into seven points when Patterson ran over Tranquill on 3rd and goal from the 3. In the final quarter, Younghoe Koo missed a 50-yard field goal for the Falcons, and Los Angeles advanced to a 3rd and 3 from the Atlanta 37. Ekeler was then initially ruled to have avoided touching the ground while being tackled a yard behind the line of scrimmage; he ran clear for a touchdown that was overturned when replays showed his left elbow graze the turf. Herbert and Carter connected for 6 yards to convert the ensuing 4th and 4, leading to a game-tying field goal for Cameron Dicker. After forcing a punt, the Chargers ran the clock down to 46 seconds while driving to the Atlanta 22. As the Falcons had no timeouts left, Los Angeles could run the clock down and kick a field goal, but Ekeler had the ball knocked loose as he dove forward to the 20. Ta'Quon Graham recovered for the Falcons and returned the ball for 19 yards before fumbling without being touched; Matt Feiler recovered at the Atlanta 43. Herbert immediately found Palmer for 22 yards to move Los Angeles back into field goal range, and Dicker made the winning kick two plays later.

The teams dominated alternating quarters. In term of first downs gained, Atlanta had advantages of 9–0 in the 1st quarter and 8–1 in the 3rd, while Los Angeles had advantages of 11–0 in the 2nd quarter and 7–2 edge in the 4th. Dicker was the 2022 Chargers' third different kicker to make a game-winning field goal in the 4th quarter or overtime, following Bertolet in Week 5 and Hopkins in Week 6. It was also Dicker's second game-winning field goal in two career games, having accomplished the same feat while playing for the Philadelphia Eagles in Week 5. Los Angeles became the third team in NFL history to trail by at least 10 points after the opening quarter of four consecutive games, following the Denver Broncos of 1962 and 1963, and the Tampa Bay Buccaneers of 1988.

Week 10: at San Francisco 49ers

The Chargers reversed their recent 1st-quarter struggles by scoring on the game's opening possession. Herbert had completions of 14 yards to Ekeler and 17 yards to Everett, both on 3rd down, then found Carter in the end zone for a 32-yard touchdown, the Chargers' longest of the season. After San Francisco responded with a short field goal, Samuel swung a 49ers receiver into James, popping the ball loose; Samuel recovered the fumble himself in 49ers territory. Los Angeles moved the ball only 3 yards, but Dicker restored their seven-point lead when his 47-yard kick crept just inside the right upright. Later, Nick Niemann deflected a punt, and the Chargers took over in opposition territory. Five plays later, Carter was tackled at the 2-yard line on a 35-yard catch-and-run. Hindered by a Foster Sarell false start penalty, Los Angeles could only manage a field goal from there. After a 49ers touchdown, Salyer kept a Los Angeles drive going by recovering Herbert's fumble. Two plays later, Herbert drew a 15-yard unnecessary roughness penalty when he was hit while scrambling. That moved the ball to the San Francisco 20 with 30 seconds left in the half, but Herbert was temporarily knocked out of the game and backup Chase Daniel could move the ball no closer. Dicker's third field goal made it 16–10 at halftime.

Herbert returned for the Los Angeles failed to score in the second half, picking up only three first downs in five possessions and advancing no further than the San Francisco 44. The 49ers scored a field goal in the 3rd quarter, then converted three 3rd downs on their go-ahead 4th-quarter touchdown drive. With two minutes left, San Francisco pinned the Chargers at their own 1 with a punt. After gaining 7 yards on three plays, Los Angeles turned the ball over on downs when Herbert was hit as he passed and Palmer couldn't pull in his wild throw. After using all their timeouts and holding San Francisco to a field goal, they had one more chance, but Herbert was immediately intercepted.

Los Angeles possessed the ball for only 2:22 in the final quarter, running eight plays for 10 yards.

Week 11: vs. Kansas City Chiefs

Allen and Williams returned for the Chargers. After the Chiefs opened the scoring with a field goal, Allen had a 17-yard catch on Los Angeles' first play from scrimmage. Two plays later, Herbert found a back-pedaling Palmer at the 5-yard line for a 50-yard touchdown. Following another Chiefs field goal, Williams converted a 3rd and 2 with a 15-yard catch, but re-injured his ankle and missed the rest of the game. Los Angeles finished that drive with a field goal, and Kansas City responded with completions of 34 and 40 yards by Mahomes before Travis Kelce's first touchdown catch. After an exchange of punts, the Chargers converted three short 3rd downs, and retook the lead when Ekeler reached the ball over the goal line. Their next drive was aided by a late hit on Herbert when Los Angeles would have faced a 4th and 2 in Chiefs territory. They drove as far as 2nd and 1 from the 2 before being driven back a yard on their next two plays. Dicker's short kick made it 20–13 at the break.

Kansas City had a 3rd and 1 on the Chargers 10 midway through the 3rd quarter, but Fox and Joe Gaziano stuffed Isiah Pacheco for the loss of a yard, and Kansas City settled for a field goal. The Chiefs faced a 3rd and 17 early on their next drive, but Mahomes converted with a 25 yards completion. He followed up with two further 3rd-down conversions, the latter being Kelce's second touchdown, which came on the first play of the final quarter. Los Angeles then crossed midfield before Allen fumbled after gaining what would have been a first down at the 32. The Chargers won the ball back six plays later when Reeder forced a fumble and Gilman recovered. Soon afterwards, a sack on Herbert left the Chargers facing 3rd and 18 at their own 38. Herbert found a diving Allen 46 yards downfield to convert; Palmer's touchdown followed four plays later with 1:46 to play. Mahomes threw incomplete on 3rd and 4 midway through the winning drive, but James was judged to have committed defensive holding, sparing the Chiefs a 4th-down conversion attempt. Kelce's scored the winning touchdown three plays later. Los Angeles still had 31 seconds and all three timeouts, but Herbert was sacked on their first play and intercepted on the second.

Week 12: at Arizona Cardinals

Los Angeles punted on their first three possessions, with Herbert sacked on 3rd down on two of them. Arizona lost a fumble the first time they had the ball (forced by James, recovered by Joseph-Day), but put up ten points on their following two. The Chargers responded with back-to-back touchdown drives. On the first of these, Palmer fumbled after an 18-yard catch to the Cardinals 38 and Arizona were initially given possession of the ball. After an official review, Bandy was credited with the recovery and Los Angeles maintained possession. The drive ended when Allen was unmarked in the left flat and scored for the first time in 2022. The Cardinals soon reached a 4th and 1 at their own 34; they went for it, and James intercepted Kyler Murray 22 yards downfield. Herbert then completed five passes in a row, with Carter left open for his 33-yard touchdown. Murray had two successful scrambles on the next drive, converting a 3rd and 6 then scoring from 5 yards out for a 17–14 halftime lead.

The teams exchanged field goal tries at the start of the second half, with Matt Prater wide left from 49 yards and Dicker successful from 26 to tie the game. Murray's second touchdown pass on the following drive put Arizona seven points ahead. After two punts each, Herbert led Los Angeles from their own 22 to a 3rd and 7 at the Cardinals 35. Herbert was then sacked for the loss of 13, and Scott punted to the Arizona 10 with 2:19 to play. Davis' 2nd-down sack helped force a three-and-out, and Los Angeles started at the Arizona 38 after Carter's 20-yard punt return. Starting with 1:48 to play, Herbert completed 5 of 6 passes for 48 yards and a touchdown on the winning drive. After Ekeler's 10-yard catch moved the ball to the 1-yard line, Los Angeles called their last timeout, then Herbert threw to Ekeler in the right flat; he was tackled immediately, but was able to reach the ball over the goal line with 15 seconds left. Everett was open over the middle for a quick throw and catch on the decisive two-point conversion, then Murray threw incomplete twice to end the game.

Week 13: at Las Vegas Raiders

Midway through the opening quarter, Murray forced a fumble that Van Noy recovered at the Raiders 25. After gaining 8 yards on three plays, Los Angeles went for it on 4th and 2, but Herbert could only scramble for 1 yard. Three plays later, Samuel tipped a Carr pass, which Callahan intercepted and returned for a touchdown. The Chargers reached a 3rd and 5 at the Las Vegas 15 on their next drive before Herbert was sacked and Dicker extended their lead with a field goal. The Raiders responded with ten points on their next two drives to tie the score, before Dicker restored the lead 27 seconds before halftime. Las Vegas kicker Daniel Carlson missed from 52 yards as time expired, leaving the Chargers 13–10 ahead.

The Raiders took control of the game in the 3rd quarter. Ekeler lost a fumble on the second play of the period, and Adams scored his first touchdown on the following play. Soon afterwards, Dicker was wide right from 52 yards, and Adams scored again two plays later. After a Los Angeles punt, Las Vegas used the final eight minutes of the quarter driving 74 yards to a 3rd and 1 on the Chargers 6. Michael Davis broke up an end zone pass on the first play of the 4th quarter, and Carlson extended the lead to 27–13. Herbert converted a 4th and 1 with a quarterback sneak early on the following drive. Later, he converted a 4th and 12 by finding Allen in the end zone for 35 yards and a touchdown. The Charger defense gave up two first downs on the next drive, but eventually forced a punt; Los Angeles took over on their own 9 with five minutes to play and a chance to tie the game. Everett had catches of 18 and 16 yards, but Herbert eventually threw incomplete on 4th and 9 from the Las Vegas 42. Los Angeles had a last chance, starting from their own 10 with 22 seconds left. They could advance only as far as the Raiders 49 before time expired.

Week 14: vs. Miami Dolphins

On their first drive of the game Los Angeles went 78 yards in 15 plays, reaching a 4th and goal from the Miami 2 before Carter stumbled while taking Herbert's pass in the left flat and was tackled for no gain. They were back in the Miami red zone on their next possession, this time taking the lead through a Dicker field goal. The Dolphins went three-and-out, with Carter returning the punt 22 yards to the Miami 43. Kelley ran for 22 yards to convert a 3rd and 1, and Williams caught Herbert's pass in the back of the end zone two plays later. To that point, the Dolphins had gained only one first down on three possessions, but they responded to the Chargers' touchdown in unusual fashion; Gilman forced a fumble that was knocked out of a scrum of players on both sides trying to recover it. Tyreek Hill picked the loose ball up and raced away to score easily. After an exchange of punts, Los Angeles began at their own 10 yard line. Herbert converted 3rd downs with completions to Allen and Palmer, then Ekeler took a short pass for 16 yards on 3rd and goal from the 17. Ekeler followed the block of Horvath to score on 4th and goal, putting the Chargers ahead 17–7 at the break.

Midway through the 3rd quarter, Hill scored his second long touchdown after Davis tripped over in coverage. Two plays into the Chargers' response, Herbert rolled right before finding Williams for 55 yards up the left sideline, setting up another Dicker field goal. Miami crossed midfield on each of their next possessions, but were pushed back both times; Fox sacked Tua Tagovailoa on the first drive, and Tranquill pressured him into committing intentional grounding on the second one. Both drives ended in punts. After the second of these, Los Angeles took over on their own 11 yard line with eleven minutes to play, and ran off over eight minutes on a 17-play drive to a field goal. Herbert and Allen combined to convert two 3rd downs on the drive, and Herbert later ran for 10 yards on a 3rd and 8. The Chargers almost turned the ball over two plays before Dicker's field goal, but Herbert recovered his own mishandled snap. Miami, operating without timeouts, were able to pull back within six points with 70 seconds still to play. Palmer then failed to gather an onside kick, but Niemann fell on the loose ball and recovered, denying the Dolphins an opportunity for a game-winning drive.

Week 15: vs. Tennessee Titans

After forcing a three-and-out by the Titans offense, the Chargers drove into opposition territory, where a sack left them facing a 3rd and 16 at the 34. Herbert completed passes of 14 and 4 yards to Allen to convert. Los Angeles followed up with six consecutive running plays, with Kelley twice converting on 3rd and short, the latter for a touchdown. After an exchange of punts, Titans running back Derrick Henry accounted for all 63 yards on the game-tying drive. In the final two minutes of the half, Herbert completed six consecutive passes to six different receivers, moving the Chargers from their own 20 to the Tennessee 25 with 12 seconds to play. From there, Herbert's end zone pass seemed to be going out of bounds, but one Titans defensive back knocked it back into play for another to intercept, keeping the score tied at 7–7.

Los Angeles crossed midfield on their first two possessions of the second half, but had to punt both times. Two plays after the second of these punts, Adderley intercepted a deep Ryan Tannehill pass, setting his offense up at the Titans 48. The Chargers advanced to the 27 before Herbert forced a pass into good coverage and was intercepted in return. After an exchange of punts, Tennessee gained a first down at the Los Angeles 25. Gaziano and Chris Rumph II each sacked Tannehill over the next three plays, and kicker Randy Bullock was wide right on a 51-yard attempt. Four plays later, Herbert's 31-yard pass to Allen moved the ball to the Titans 15, from where Ekeler had runs of 12 and 3 yards, the latter for a touchdown. Sacks by Van Noy and Tranquill on the next two Tennessee drives were instrumental in forcing the Titans to punt, but Los Angeles had to punt the ball back each time. Starting from his own 26 with three minutes to play, Tannehill went completed all 6 of his passes on the game-tying drive, scoring himself on 3rd and goal with a quarterback sneak. Staley used all three of his timeouts late on the Titans' drive to preserve time for a response, and Herbert had 44 seconds to work with when he began at his own 23. After completions of 16 yards to Williams and 6 yards to Everett, both of whom got out of bounds to stop the clock, Herbert rolled right and found the leaping Williams for 35 yards up the sideline. A delay of game penalty pushed the Chargers back 5 yards, but Dicker hit the game-winner from 43 yards without difficulty.

Week 16: at Indianapolis Colts

Aided by other results earlier in the week, Los Angeles could clinch a playoff berth with a win. Davis and James both intercepted Nick Foles in the 1st quarter, but the Chargers converted neither turnover into points; they gained no first downs on their first four possessions, and Herbert was himself intercepted once. Following back-to-back sacks by Tranquill and Murray, the Chargers drove to their first touchdown. Herbert converted a 3rd and 7 with an 8-yard pass to Palmer, a 3rd and 13 with a 16-yard pass to Williams, and a 3rd and 1 with a 2-yard quarterback sneak; Ekeler scored on the next play. James gave up two 15-yard penalties on the following drive, once for a facemask and once for leading with his helmet while impacting a defenceless player; he was disqualified for the latter offense, and Indianapolis scored their only points at the end of the drive. Allen almost had a 48-yard touchdown reception before halftime, but stepped narrowly out of bounds at the Colts 23. Los Angeles instead scored with a short Dicker field goal and led 10–3 at halftime.

Samuel intercepted Foles' first pass attempt of the second half, leading to another field goal. Indianapolis had a chance to score when Herbert was sacked and fumbled at his own 21. The Colts reached a 4th and 1 at the 12 and went for it on the first play of the final quarter, but the Los Angeles defensive line stopped Foles for no gain on a quarterback sneak. The Chargers then made the game safe. Williams had a 26-yard catch on 3rd and 5, while Ekeler converted a 3rd and 1 and finished the 88-yard drive with a 16-yard run and a 1-yard touchdown on consecutive plays.

Week 17: vs. Los Angeles Rams

The Rams drove from their own 14 to the Chargers 5 in the opening quarter; they kicked a short field goal after Davis broke up a pass on 3rd and goal. Williams had 26 and 19 yard receptions on the following drive, which ended with Ekeler's first touchdown run. After a Rams punt, Ekeler scored again; he ran through the right guard area, broke a single tackle near the line of scrimmage, then raced clear for a 72-yard touchdown. It was the longest run of his career. The Rams responded with their lone touchdown of the game, then an athletic one-handed catch by Williams set up Dicker's field goal late in the half for a 17–10 lead.

Herbert completed 5 of 5 passes for 48 yards on the opening drive of the second half, finishing the drive by finding Everett on 3rd down for a touchdown. The Rams reached a 3rd and 5 at the Chargers 35, but Van Noy knocked the ball from Baker Mayfield's hands and recovered it himself. After an exchange of punts, Herbert found Allen for 28 yards to move into Rams territory, then Parham for a touchdown on 3rd and goal. Herbert then left the game, and the Rams gained no first downs on their last three possessions as the Chargers eased to victory.

Week 18: at Denver Broncos

Due to a result earlier in the day, Los Angeles were assured of entering the playoffs as the AFC's No. 5 at kickoff. Herbert nonetheless played most of the game; he had completions of 30 and 14 yards to Allen on the opening drive, the latter for a touchdown. Denver also scored a touchdown on their first drive, then both teams punted before the Chargers converted four times on 3rd down to retake the lead through Everett's touchdown catch. Ekeler's third lost fumble of the season led to a Broncos field goal. Dicker restored Los Angeles' seven-point lead with only 26 seconds left in the half, but that was enough time for Denver to level at 17–17; Jerry Jeudy got behind Gilman and James for a 57-yard catch from Russell Wilson, who threw a touchdown on the following play.

Russell threw another touchdown on the first drive of the second half, then combined with Jeudy for another 50 yards. Two plays later, Van Noy deflected a pass and Joseph-Day intercepted it, leading to another Dicker field goal. The Chargers threatened to take the lead on their next drive, but Carter fumbled at the Denver 15 after a 25-yard catch. Wilson then had his third 50-plus yard completion of the game to set up his third touchdown pass with eleven minutes to play. Chase Daniel then replaced Herbert at quarterback. His first drive resulted in a punt, which was muffed by the Broncos and recovered by Gilman at the Denver 29; that led to Daniel's passes to Allen and Palmer for a touchdown and two-point conversion. Los Angeles had one more possession, but went three-and-out and Denver ran off the final 3:14 of the game.

Staley received criticism for playing his starters for longer than necessary in a game that did not affect playoff seeding, especially after Williams was diagnosed with a back fracture that would keep him out of the Chargers' wild card playoff game in Jacksonville; he was injured after making a catch during the Chargers' fifth offensive series in Denver. Speaking about the decision, Staley said, "It’s very difficult to decide who plays and who doesn't and who's more valuable than the rest. What you’re trying to do is set a standard for your program about how you do things."

Standings

Division

Conference

Postseason

Schedule

Game summaries

AFC Wild Card Playoffs: at (4) Jacksonville Jaguars

Jacksonville overcame five first-half turnovers and a 27–0 deficit to win on Riley Patterson's walk-off field goal. This was the third largest comeback in NFL postseason history.[19]

On the second play of the game, Jags QB Trevor Lawrence’s pass was intercepted by Drue Tranquill, who returned it 15 yards to the Jacksonville 18-yard line. This set up Austin Ekeler’s 13-yard touchdown run to give the Chargers a 7–0 lead. Then on Jacksonville's next drive, Lawrence was intercepted again, this time by Asante Samuel Jr., who returned the ball 16 yards to the LA 39. From there, quarterback Justin Herbert completed 3 passes for 40 yards on a 57-yard drive to go up 10–0 on Cameron Dicker’s 22-yard field goal. Following a punt from each team, Samuel recorded his second interception, returning this one for 4 yards to the Jaguars 16-yard line. Ekeler then took the ball to the end zone with three consecutive carries, the last one a 6-yard touchdown run that gave the Chargers a 17–0 lead with 37 seconds left in the first quarter.

Jacksonville was quickly forced to punt and the Chargers drove back for more points, this time going 67 yards in 13 plays, including Herbert's 23-yard completion to tight end Gerald Everett to convert a 3rd and 11. On the last play, he hit Everett again for a 9-yard score, increasing the team's lead to 24–0. Jamal Agnew gave the Jags a chance to respond by returning the kickoff 52 yards to midfield. But after two incompletions, Lawrence threw his third interception of the day and fourth overall to Samuel. Then Jacksonville turned the ball over again when Chris Claybrooks muffed a Jags punt and Amen Ogbongbemiga recovered it on the Jaguars 6-yard line. Three plays later, Dicker kicked a 23-yard field goal to give LA a 27–0 lead with 4:28 left in the half. Jacksonville had to punt on their next drive, but their defense forced a crucial three-and-out that included a stop on 3rd and 1, forcing a J. K. Scott punt that went just 34 yards before Tevaughn Campbell returned it 4 yards to the LA 47-yard line. Lawrence subsequently led the Jags 47 yards in 8 plays, including his 12-yard completion to Marvin Jones on 4th and 1, to score on his 9-yard touchdown pass to Evan Engram making the score 27–7 going into halftime.

LA took the second half kickoff and drove to the Jacksonville 38, but were stopped there and decided to punt. Scott's kick pinned the Jaguars on their own 11-yard line, but it didn't stop them from driving 89 yards in 17 plays. Lawrence completed 8 passes for 68 yards on the drive, the last a 6-yard touchdown completion to Jones that cut their deficit to 27–14. Herbert struck back with a pair of completions to Everett for gains of 21 and 25 yards to set up Dicker's 50-yard field goal, putting the Chargers up 30–14. Agnew returned the kickoff 36 yards to the Jaguars' 32-yard line. From there, Jacksonville drove 68 yards in 7 plays to score on Lawrence's 39-yard touchdown pass to Zay Jones, making the score 30–20 after the 2-point conversion failed.

Los Angeles got the ball back with 40 seconds left in the third quarter and managed to run the clock down to under 9 minutes with a 17-play drive to the Jags 22-yard line, but came up empty when Dicker's 40-yard field goal went wide left. Jacksonville took over and drove 64 yards in 11 plays, with Lawrence completing a 21-yard pass to Engram and 3 passes to Christian Kirk for 35 yards, the last a 9-yard touchdown catch. Chargers defensive end Joey Bosa was penalized for unsportsmanlike conduct on the play, moving the ball to the 1-yard for the point after touchdown. The Jaguars took advantage of the penalty by going for two, scoring on Lawrence's 1-yard run to cut their deficit to 30–28 with 5:30 left in the game.

On the first play after the ensuing kickoff, Herbert was sacked for an 8-yard loss by Roy Robertson-Harris. He managed to complete passes on his next two plays, but they were not enough for a first down, and so the Chargers punted with 3:20 remaining. Jacksonville then put together a 10-play, 61-yard drive for the game-winning score. Three completions for 24 yards and an 8-yard run by Lawrence brought up first down at midfield. A few plays later, they faced a crucial 4th and 1 on the Chargers 41-yard line. Travis Etienne took a pitch and ran around the right side of the line for a 25-yard gain to the Chargers 16. After running the clock down to the final seconds, Patterson's 36-yard field goal gave the Jags a win as time ran out. It is the largest blown lead in Chargers history as they became the first team to lose a playoff game with a turnover margin of +5.[20]

Lawrence completed 28 of 47 passes for 288 yards and 4 touchdowns, with 4 interceptions, and rushed once for 8 yards. Etienne was the top rusher of the day with 20 carries for 109 yards and caught a pass for 12. Engram had 7 receptions for 93 yards and a score. Agnew returned 4 kickoffs for 134 yards. Herbert finished 27/43 for 273 yards and a touchdown, while also rushing 3 times for 12 yards. Everett was his top target with 6 catches for 109 yards and a score. Samuel had 3 tackles and 3 interceptions. Ekeler, who had 1,637 yards from scrimmage and 107 receptions during the season, scored two touchdowns, but was held to just 13 carries for 35 yards and 2 receptions for 8 yards. Chargers coach Brandon Staley was later quoted as saying that "we choked", a sentiment also said by linebacker Kyle Van Noy.[21][22]

Following the game, Los Angeles fired offensive coordinator Joe Lombardi and passing game coordinator & quarterbacks coach Shane Day.[23]

Statistics

Team

Individual

Statistics correct as of the end of the 2022 NFL season

References

External links
 

Los Angeles Chargers
Los Angeles Chargers seasons
Los Angeles Chargers
Chargers